Western Mound Township (T10N R9W) is located in Macoupin County, Illinois, United States. As of the 2010 census, its population was 272 and it contained 130 housing units.

Geography

Demographics

Adjacent townships
 Barr Township (north)
 South Palmyra Township (northeast)
 Bird Township (east)
 Polk Township (southeast)
 Chesterfield Township (south)
 Ruyle Township, Jersey County (southwest)
 Rockbridge Township, Greene County (west)
 Rubicon Township, Greene County (northwest)

References

External links
US Census
City-data.com
Illinois State Archives

Townships in Macoupin County, Illinois
Townships in Illinois